Wisconsin's 1st congressional district is a congressional district of the United States House of Representatives in southeastern Wisconsin, covering Kenosha County, Racine County, and most of Walworth County, as well as portions of Rock County and Milwaukee County. The district's current Representative is Republican Bryan Steil. 

Among the district's previous representatives are U.S. Secretary of Defense Les Aspin and Speaker of the House and 2012 Vice Presidential-nominee Paul Ryan.

A slightly Republican-leaning district, it was carried by George W. Bush in 2004 with 53%; the district voted for Barack Obama over John McCain in 2008, 51.40–47.45% and the district voted for Mitt Romney over Barack Obama in 2012, 52.12%–47.88%. It stayed Republican in 2016, with a majority of voters polling for Donald Trump.

Counties and municipalities within the district

Kenosha County
 Brighton, Bristol, Genoa City, Kenosha, Paddock Lake, Paris, Pleasant Prairie, Randall, Salem Lakes, Somers,  Twin Lakes, and Wheatland

Milwaukee County
 Cudahy, Franklin, Greendale, Hales Corners, Oak Creek, South Milwaukee, and St. Francis.

Racine County
 Burlington, Caledonia, Dover, Elmwood, Mount Pleasant, North Bay, Norway, Raymond, Rochester, Sturtevant, Union Grove, Wateford, Wind Point, and Yorkville.

Rock
 Beloit, Bradford, Center, Clinton, Janesville, La Prairie, Milton (most), and Turtle (most).

Walworth
 Bloomfield, Darien, Delavan, Elkhorn, Geneva, Fontana-on-Geneva Lake, Lake Geneva, Sharon, Whitewater (Walworth County side), and Williams Bay.

Recent election results from statewide races 
Currently, it is a swing district that leans Republican, although it was redrawn to be more Democratic-leaning in 2022.

List of members representing the district

Electoral history

2002 district boundaries (2002–2011)

2011 district boundaries (2012–2021)

References

 
 
 Congressional Biographical Directory of the United States 1774–present

01
Paul Ryan